McKenzie County is a county in the U.S. state of North Dakota. As of the 2020 census, the population was 14,704. Its county seat is Watford City.

The county lies immediately adjacent to the Williston Micropolitan Statistical Area, although the Census Bureau does not include McKenzie County in that grouping.

History
The Dakota Territory legislature created the county on March 9, 1883, with areas partitioned from Howard County (now extinct). The county was named for Alexander McKenzie, a territorial political figure who was later disgraced for corruption. The county was not organized at that time, and was not attached to another county for administrative or judicial purposes. The county's boundary was altered in 1885, and on March 2, 1891, the state legislature authorized the dissolution of the county, assigning its territories to Billings and Stark counties. However, this directive was not implemented, and McKenzie continued as a defined county until November 3, 1896, when another act was passed to dissolve the county and assign its territories to Billings County. This act was challenged in the courts, and on May 24, 1901, the state Supreme Court held that the county was to continue in existence.

On March 10, 1903, the county was attached to Stark County for administrative purposes. On March 16, 1905, McKenzie gained the territories of Allred and Wallace counties as those counties were administratively dissolved. On April 20, 1905, the McKenzie County government was organized, and its previous attachment to Stark was terminated.

The first county seat was Alexander. In 1907 the seat was moved to Schafer, and in 1941 it was moved to the present location, Watford City.

Between the 2010 and 2020 censuses, McKenzie County was the fastest growing county in the United States, growing by 131.2% from 6,360 to 14,704 inhabitants, largely due to the Bakken Formation oil boom.

Geography
McKenzie County lies on the west line of North Dakota. Its west boundary line abuts the east boundary line of the state of Montana. The Missouri River flows easterly along the western portion of the county's north boundary line, and the enlargement of the Missouri as it discharges into Lake Sakakawea forms the eastern portion of the county's north and northeastern boundary line. The Yellowstone River flows into the northwestern corner of the county from Montana, and discharges into the Missouri at the county's northern boundary line. The Little Missouri River flows northeasterly through the county's lower portion, on its way to discharge into Lake Sakakawea, east of the county's east boundary line. The county terrain consists of semi-arid rolling hills, carved by river valleys and drainages. The area is partially devoted to agriculture. The terrain slopes to the east and north, with its highest point on its south boundary line, at 2,684' (818m) ASL. It is the largest county in North Dakota by area.

The McKenzie County landscape features a wide diversity of physical features, ranging from sugarbeet fields bordering the Missouri River at the northwest corner of the county to rugged badlands near the Little Missouri River in the south, where Theodore Roosevelt National Park and the Little Missouri National Grassland are located. Between the two rivers is a large area of prairie, ranging from gentle rolling terrain to rocky, rugged pastures. The southeast corner of the county, bordering on the Little Missouri badlands of neighboring Dunn County, is abundant in wildlife, quaking aspen groves, and bur oak groves, interspersed in places with western red cedar on the north-facing slopes of the badlands.

The southwestern corner counties of North Dakota (Adams, Billings, Bowman, Golden Valley, Grant, Hettinger, Slope, Stark) observe Mountain Time. The counties of McKenzie, Dunn, and Sioux are split between Mountain and Central Time.

Major highways

  U.S. Highway 85
  North Dakota Highway 22
  North Dakota Highway 23
  North Dakota Highway 58
  North Dakota Highway 68
  North Dakota Highway 73
  North Dakota Highway 200
  North Dakota Highway 1806

Adjacent counties

 Williams County - north (observes Central Time)
 Mountrail County - northeast (observes Central Time)
 Dunn County - southeast (observes Mountain Time in western section)
 Billings County - south (observes Mountain Time)
 Golden Valley County - southwest (observes Mountain Time)
 Wibaux County, Montana - west (observes Mountain Time)
 Richland County, Montana - northwest (observes Mountain Time)

Protected areas

 Antelope Creek State Game Management Area
 Antelope Creek State Wildlife Refuge
 Bear Den Creek Public Use Area
 Little Missouri National Grassland (part)
 Maah Daah Hey Trail
 Theodore Roosevelt National Park (North Unit - contained within LM National Grassland)
 Tobacco Garden Creek State Game Management Area
 Tobacco Garden Creek Recreation Area

Lakes
 Demicks Lake
 Lake Sakakawea
 Nohly Lake

Demographics

2000 census
As of the 2000 census, there were 5,737 people, 2,151 households, and 1,548 families in the county. The population density was 2.08/sqmi (0.80/km2). There were 2,719 housing units at an average density of 0.99/sqmi (0.38/km2). The racial makeup of the county was 77.36% White, 0.07% Black or African American, 21.18% Native American, 0.05% Asian, 0.02% Pacific Islander, 0.14% from other races, and 1.19% from two or more races. 1.01% of the population were Hispanic or Latino of any race. 33.4% were of Norwegian and 20.9% German ancestry.

There were 2,151 households, out of which 34.50% had children under the age of 18 living with them, 57.90% were married couples living together, 9.30% had a female householder with no husband present, and 28.00% were non-families. 25.80% of all households were made up of individuals, and 13.10% had someone living alone who was 65 years of age or older. The average household size was 2.64 and the average family size was 3.17.

The county population contained 30.60% under the age of 18, 5.50% from 18 to 24, 23.30% from 25 to 44, 24.90% from 45 to 64, and 15.70% who were 65 years of age or older. The median age was 40 years. For every 100 females there were 100.70 males. For every 100 females age 18 and over, there were 98.90 males.

The median income for a household in the county was $29,342, and the median income for a family was $34,091. Males had a median income of $26,351 versus $20,147 for females. The per capita income for the county was $14,732. About 13.70% of families and 17.20% of the population were below the poverty line, including 22.10% of those under age 18 and 12.70% of those age 65 or over.

2010 census
As of the 2010 census, there were 6,360 people, 2,410 households, and 1,682 families in the county. The population density was 2.30/sqmi (0.89/km2). There were 3,090 housing units at an average density of 1.12/sqmi (0.43/km2). The racial makeup of the county was 75.3% white, 22.2% American Indian, 0.3% Asian, 0.1% black or African American, 0.4% from other races, and 1.6% from two or more races. Those of Hispanic or Latino origin made up 2.2% of the population. In terms of ancestry, 39.5% were Norwegian, 30.6% were German, 6.1% were Irish, and 0.7% were American.

Of the 2,410 households, 33.7% had children under the age of 18 living with them, 52.7% were married couples living together, 10.2% had a female householder with no husband present, 30.2% were non-families, and 25.3% of all households were made up of individuals. The average household size was 2.58 and the average family size was 3.06. The median age was 38.0 years.

The median income for a household in the county was $48,480 and the median income for a family was $58,906. Males had a median income of $42,803 versus $33,056 for females. The per capita income for the county was $27,605. About 6.7% of families and 10.0% of the population were below the poverty line, including 12.8% of those under age 18 and 10.0% of those age 65 or over.

Communities

Cities
 Alexander
 Arnegard
 Watford City (county seat)

Census-designated places
 East Fairview
 Four Bears Village
 Mandaree

Unincorporated communities

 Banks
 Cartwright
 Charbonneau
 Charlson
 Dore
 Grassy Butte
 Hawkeye
 Johnsons Corner (or Johnson Corner)
 Keene
 Kroff
 Rawson
 Schafer

Townships

 Alex
 Antelope Creek
 Arnegard
 Blue Butte
 Charbon
 Elm Tree
 Ellsworth
 Grail
 Hawkeye
 Keene
 Randolph
 Riverview
 Sioux
 Tri
 Twin Valley
 Yellowstone

Defunct Townships
Elk, Poe, and Wilbur townships merged January 1, 2002 to form Tri Township.

Politics
McKenzie County voters have traditionally voted Republican. In only one national election since 1948 has the county selected the Democratic Party candidate (as of 2020).

Education
School districts include:

K-12:

 Alexander Public School District 2
 Mandaree Public School District 36
 McKenzie County Public School District 1
 New Town Public School District 1
 Williston Basin School District 7

Elementary:
 Earl Public School District 18
 Horse Creek Public School District 32
 Yellowstone Public School District 14

Former districts
 Grassy Butte District - Merged into the Killdeer district
 Williston Public School District 1 - Merged into Williston Basin district in 2021

See also
 National Register of Historic Places listings in McKenzie County, North Dakota

References

External links
 McKenzie County Portal
 As the Sod Was Turned (Norma Berntson, 1959) from the Digital Horizons website
 McKenzie County maps, Sheet 1 (northeastern), Sheet 2 (northwestern), and Sheet 3 (southern), North Dakota DOT

 
North Dakota counties on the Missouri River
1905 establishments in North Dakota
Populated places established in 1905
Counties in multiple time zones